Preeti Bose (born 20 April 1992 in Sonipat, Haryana) is an Indian cricketer. She plays for Haryana women's cricket team in domestic matches.She is the first woman player from Haryana to play for India women's team, Indian railway team and T20 Women's Asia Cup final.

Cricket Career

One Day International
On 19 February 2016, Bose played her first one day international match for India Women against Sri Lanka Women and took two wickets in the match.

Preeti Bose's bowling helped India win the 2016 Women's Asia Cup T20 title by 17 runs against Pakistan in Bangkok.

References

External links 
 cricketarchive

1992 births
Living people
Indian women cricketers
India women One Day International cricketers
Haryana women cricketers
North Zone women cricketers
Royal Challengers Bangalore (WPL) cricketers
People from Sonipat
Cricketers from Haryana
Sportswomen from Haryana
India women Twenty20 International cricketers